École supérieure d'électronique de l'Ouest (ESEO) is a French graduate engineering school created in 1956 by Jean Jeanneteau.

It is located in Angers, Dijon, Vélizy and Shanghai, and specializes in the field of electronics.

The college is member of the Conférence des Grandes Écoles.

History 
The 9th of October 1956, Canon Jean Jeanneteau (1908-1992) founded the ESEO in Angers, a "sister school" to the Institut supérieur d'électronique de Paris (ISEP) and the Institut supérieur de l'électronique et du numérique (ISEN). The three schools founded the FESIC, with joint recruitment of students and educational partnerships.

The official name of the school since its creation is École supérieure d'électronique de l'Ouest, but this name is no longer used within the school since 2006 (only "ESEO" or "Groupe ESEO" are used).

Notable alumni 
 Jean-Pascal Tricoire, a French business executive

References

External links 
 

Engineering universities and colleges in France
Grandes écoles
Angers
Dijon